The following outline is provided as an overview of and topical guide to wine

Definition 
Wine is an alcoholic beverage typically made of fermented grape juice. The natural chemical balance of grapes is such that they can ferment without the addition of sugars, acids, enzymes or other nutrients. Wine is produced by fermenting crushed grapes using various types of yeast.  Yeast consumes the sugars found in the grapes and converts them into alcohol. Different varieties of grapes and strains of yeasts are used depending on the type of wine being produced. Wine includes the following ingredients:
 Ethanol – the type of alcohol found in alcoholic beverages. It is a volatile, flammable, colorless liquid, and also a psychoactive drug.
 Fermented grape juice – what wine is made from
 Fermentation – process that turns grape juice into an alcoholic beverage. During fermentation yeast interact with sugars in the juice to create ethanol.
 Grape – fruit that grows on the perennial and deciduous woody vines of the genus Vitis. Grapes can be eaten raw or used for making jam, juice, vinegar, wine, raisins, and grape seed oil.
 Juice – the liquid that is naturally contained in fruit or vegetable tissue.

Scientific makeup:
 Wine chemistry
 Acids in wine
 Phenolic compounds in wine
 Proteins in wine
 Sugars in wine
 Yeast assimilable nitrogen
 Minerals
 Dissolved gas (CO2)
 Monoterpenes and sesquiterpenes
 Glutathione

Types of wine

Wine styles 
 Aromatized wine – A fortified wine with added herbs, spices, or flavorings.
 Dessert wine – A category of sweet wines served with dessert.
 Fortified wine – Fortified wine is a wine that has had a distilled spirit added to it in order to end fermentation, help preservation, or influence flavor. The addition of additional ethanol kills yeast, leaving a wine that is high in sugar and alcohol content.
 Fruit wine – Fruit wine is a fermented alcoholic beverage made from a variety of base ingredients and can be made from virtually any plant matter that can be fermented. The fruits used in winemaking are fermented using yeast and aged in wood barrels to improve the taste and flavor quality.
 Ice wine – Ice wine is a type of dessert wine made from frozen grapes. Grapes are frozen on the vine around 20 °F (-7 °C), and late crushed in a grape press. The sugars in the grapes do not freeze, thus creating wine with higher sugar concentrations. Ice wine production is risky because many grapes do not survive the cold temperatures—resulting in ice wines being generally expensive.
 Orange wine – Amber wine gets its name from its deep orange color. This wine is made by leaving white wine grapes in contact with the skins, stems, and seeds during fermentation.
 Red wine – A still wine with red to purple hues created by grape skin pigments, made from dark-colored grapes
 Rosé – Rosé is a style of wine that is made by juicing red grapes and allowing them to macerate for a short period to give the juice a pinkish hue. The maceration step only lasts two to three days and after that, the skins are removed, and the juice is allowed to ferment. Provence, France is the region that is most famous for the best rosés in the world.
 Sparkling wine – Sparkling wine is made by fermenting wine twice. During the second fermentation, the wine is aged with lees at the bottom of the wine barrel. While the wine is being aged, the autolysis of yeast occurs which gives the wine the sparkling component.
 Straw wine – Straw wines are made from a centuries-old method of laying grapes out on straw mats for long periods to be dehydrated by the sun.  The dehydration results in more concentrated flavors and sugars in the grapes, leading to typically sweeter wines.  They are often paired with desserts, fruit, and charcuterie, or served as an aperitif.
 Table wine 
 White wine – A clear to yellow wine made from white grapes or dark-colored grapes

Grape varieties 
Grape varieties – below are some examples of grape varieties from which wine is made:
(This list does not render on mobile; try the Desktop view link at the bottom of the page)

Wine by country and region 

 Argentina
Mendoza – Prominent for Malbec, Cabernet Sauvignon, and Tempranillo
San Juan – Argentina's second largest wine producer, with Syrah, Bonardo, sherry-style wines, brandies, and vermouth.
La Rioja – The small region produces Moscatel de Alexandrias and Torrontés made from a local sub-variety known as Torrontés Riojano.
Northwestern regions – 
Patagonia – The source for much of Argentina's sparkling wine
 Australia
 New South Wales –
 South Australia –
 Tasmania –
 Victoria –
 Western Australia –
 Queensland –

 Chile
 Central Valley –
 France
 Alsace – 
 Bordeaux –
 Burgundy –
 Champagne –
 Corsica –
 Jura –
 Languedoc-Roussillon –
 Loire –
 Provence –
 Rhône –
 Savoy –
 South West –

Classification systems

  European Union: Protected Designation of Origin (PDO)
  Austria: Districtus Austriae Controllatus (DAC)
  Cyprus:  Ελεγχόμενη Ονομασία Προέλευσης
  France: Appellation d'origine contrôlée (AOC)
  Germany: German wine classification
  Greece: ονομασία προελεύσεως ελεγχομένη
  Italy: Denominazione di Origine Controllata (DOC)
  Luxembourg: Appellation contrôlée
  Portugal: Denominação de Origem Controlada (DOC)
  Romania: Denumire de Origine Controlată (DOC)
  Spain: Denominación de origen protegida (DOP)
  Switzerland: Appellation d'origine contrôlée (AOC)
  Australia: Geographical Indications (GI)
  Argentina: Denominación de origen - see also Argentine wine
  Canada: Vintners Quality Alliance (VQA)
  Brazil: Denominação de Origem (DO)
  Chile: see Chilean wine
  South Africa: Wine of Origin (WO)
  United Kingdom: Protected Designation of Origin (PDO)
  United States: American Viticultural Area (AVA)

Wine industry

Wine packaging 
 Wine label –

Types of wine packages
 Bottle –
 Box and bag –
 Jug –

Seals
 Wine cork
 Alternative wine closure
 Screw cap

Accessories

 Wine glass
 Corkscrew
 Decanter

Wine professions and qualifications 
 Vintner –
 Master of Wine –
 Winemaker –
 Court of Master Sommeliers
 Wine & Spirit Education Trust

Trends and impacts 
 Wine club –
 Globalization of wine –
 Global warming and wine –

Wine production 
 Winery –
 Vineyard –
 Viticulture –
 Annual growth cycle of grapevines –
 Ripeness in viticulture –
 Winemaking –
 Harvest –
 Mechanical harvesting –
 Pressing (wine)
Wine press – device used to extract juice from crushed grapes during wine making.
 History of the wine press
 Must – freshly pressed fruit juice (usually grape juice) that contains the skins, seeds, and stems of the fruit.
 Pomace – solid remains of grapes, olives, or other fruit after pressing for juice or oil. It contains the skins, pulp, seeds, and stems of the fruit.  In winemaking, the length of time that the pomace stays in the juice is critical for the final character of the wine.
 Fermentation –
 Co-fermentation –
 Maceration – the soaking of fruit skins and other material in must that is an important process by which phenolics and volatiles present in the unprocessed fruit may be extracted. Maceration time has a primary role in the appearance and sensory attributes of the finished wine.
 Malolactic fermentation –
 Oak in wine production –
 Storage of wine –
 Aging of wine –

Wine selecting 
 Wine and food pairing –
 Wine competitions –
 Wine tasting –
 Blind tasting of wine –
 Vertical and horizontal wine tasting –

Wine in culture 
 Christianity and wine –
 Cocktails with wine, sparkling wine, or port –
 Comité Régional d'Action Viticole –
 Cult wines –
 Drinking culture –
 Dionysus –
 Standard drink –

Wine and health 

 Alcohol –
 Short-term effects of alcohol consumption –
 Alcohol intoxication –
 Alcohol and sex –
 Blood alcohol content –
 Long-term effects of alcohol consumption –
 Alcohol dementia –
 Alcohol and cancer –
 Alcohol and cardiovascular disease –
 Alcohol and weight –
 Alcoholism –
 Alcohol abuse –
 Alcohol dependence –
 Alcohol withdrawal syndrome –
 Fetal alcohol syndrome –
 Recommended maximum intake of alcoholic beverages –
 French Paradox –
 Phenolic compounds in wine –
 Polyphenol antioxidant –
 Resveratrol –
 Red wine headache –

History of wine

By period 
 Neolithic Period – The earliest marks of viticulture can be traced back to Georgia, where archaeologists found grape pips similar to those of vitis vinifera sativa from as early as the 6th millennium B.C. Wine production during this period was most likely done through the use of kvevri, large earthenware pottery used for fermentation and storage.
 Ancient Greece and wine – The ancient Greeks pioneered new methods of viticulture and wine production which they shared with early winemaking communities in what are now France, Italy, Austria and Russia, as well as others through trade and colonization.
 Ancient Rome and wine –
 Champagne Riots –
 Ancient Scandinavia – The Ancient Scandinavians produced a grog that was an alcoholic mixture of grains, honey, herbs, fruits, and occasionally even grape wine. Grog has been dated to the years 1500-200 BC, and Ancient Greek and Roman texts have dismissed grog as "barley rotted in water" rather than actual wine.

By region 
 Africa
 History of South African wine
 Asia
 Wine in the Middle East
 Europe
 History of French wine
 History of Bordeaux wine
 History of Portuguese wine
 History of Spanish wine
 History of Rioja wine
 History of Sherry
 North America
 History of American wine
 History of California wine
 History of Oregon wine production

Organizations and institutions
 Academie du Vin –
 American Society for Enology and Viticulture –
 APCOR (Portugal) –
 ASDW Association of Small Direct Wine Merchants (United Kingdom) –
 Assembly of European Wine-producing Regions –
 Australian Society of Viticulture and Oenology –
 Australian Wine Research Institute –
 Comite Interprofessionnel du Vin de Champagne –
 Comité Régional d'Action Viticole –
 Cool Climate Oenology and Viticulture Institute (Canada) –
 Garagistes (France) –
 Geilweilerhof Institute for Grape Breeding (Germany) –
 Geisenheim Grape Breeding Institute (Germany) –
 Institut National des Appellations d'Origine –
 International Organisation of Vine and Wine –
 L'Academie du Vin –
 Missouri Valley Wine Society –
 Wine Institute (California) –
 Wine Institute of New Zealand –
 Wine Research Centre (Canada) –
 Wine and Spirit Trade Association (United Kingdom) –

Publications 
 Australian & New Zealand Wine Industry Journal –
 Wine Spectator –

Other
 Beaujolais Day –
 The Berthomeau Report –
 Fighting varietals –
House wine –
 Plan Bordeaux –
 Prohibition –
 Riesling Trail –
 Semi-generic –
 Sake –
 Super Tuscans –
 Temperance movement –
 Terroir –
 Wine defect –
Wine list –
Wine Parkerization –

Persons influential in the field of wine 

 List of wine personalities
 Kathy Arnink –
 Oz Clarke –
 Antonio Galloni –
 James Halliday –
 Kermit Lynch –
 Robert Mondavi –
 Russ Moss –
 Robert Parker –
 Jancis Robinson –
 Michel Rolland –

Wine-related films and television
 Falcon Crest –
 Mondovino –
 Sideways –
 Wine TV –
 Bottle Shock –

See also

References

External links 

The Guardian & Observer Guide to Wine
The wine anorak by wine writer Jamie Goode
 Wine Glossary, from Wine Spectator

Wine
Wine